Promise Lands is the fourth album by English band Lowgold, released in 2008 on Goldhawk Recordings.

The album was recorded at The Dairy, Brixton, London and at Darren Ford's home studio, co-produced by Ford and Dan Roe and mixed by Gareth Parton who has previously worked with The Go! Team. Burning Embers was released as a digital single.

Track listing
All songs written by Darren Lee Ford except "Farmer's Tale" by Dan Symons. 
"Clear"
"Burning Embers"
"Just Like Skin"
"Don't Let Love In"
"Flame"
"When The Song Is Over"
"Dead Sea"
"Nothing Stays The Same"
"Farmer's Tale"
"Hope And Reason"
"Silk And Steel"
"Climb The Sea"
"Feathered Word"

(11-13 iTunes only bonus tracks)

UK singles
"Burning Embers" (2008)

Personnel
 Darren Ford – guitar, drums, vocals
 Dan Symons – guitar
 Miles Willey – bass guitar

References

2008 albums
Lowgold albums